Getter Saar (born 9 November 1999) is an Estonian footballer who plays as a forward for Flora and the Estonia women's national team.

Career
She made her debut for the Estonia national team on 4 October 2019 against Turkey, coming on as a substitute for Signy Aarna.

References

1999 births
Living people
Women's association football forwards
Estonian women's footballers
Estonia women's international footballers
FC Flora (women) players
Footballers from Tallinn